Matej Juhart (born November 19, 1976) is a German bobsledder who competed for his native Germany and now Croatia and has been a regular in international bobsled competitions since 2005. His lone World Cup victory was in a four-man event at Altenberg, Germany in December 2008. He is now a PE teacher in Slovenian middle school in Kamnik (Gimnazija in srednja šola Rudolfa Maistra).

References

 

1976 births
German male bobsledders
Croatian male bobsledders
Living people